Amaurobius ausobskyi is a species of spiders in the family Amaurobiidae, found in Greece.

References

ausobskyi
Spiders described in 1998
Spiders of Europe